Calliotropis conoeides is a species of sea snail, a marine gastropod mollusc in the family Eucyclidae.

Description
The shell grows to a height of 32 mm.

Distribution
This species occurs in the Pacific Ocean off the Solomon Islands and Papua New Guinea.

References

External links
 

conoeides
Gastropods described in 2007